Ada Nicodemou (Greek: Άντα Νικοδήμου) (born 14 May 1977) is an Australian actress of Greek Cypriot descent . She began her acting career in 1994 in TV serial Heartbreak High as Katerina Ioannou. She also starred in Police Rescue and Breakers. 

In 2000, Nicodemou joined the cast in the soap opera Home and Away as Leah Patterson, which gives her the distinction of being the third longest actor in an Australian TV soap opera, coincidently behind fellow Home and Away cast members Ray Meagher and Lynne McGranger

She hosted reality series Please Marry My Boy in 2012.

Early life
Nicodemou was born on 14 May 1977 in Carlton, New South Wales. Nicodemou's parents were both migrants, who met in Australia. Her Greek Cypriot family comes from Limassol. Nicodemou grew up in Minto along with her younger brother. Nicodemou attended The Grange Public School, and the Johnny Young Talent School, where she learned to sing, dance and act.

Career
Nicodemou began her acting career in 1994 when she was cast as Katerina Ioannou in ABC1's Heartbreak High. Nicodemou was 16 when she successfully auditioned for the role. She was originally contracted to play the part for 12 weeks, but this was later extended.

Nicodemou also had starring roles on Police Rescue, and Network Ten's Breakers. In 1999, she played Dujour in the science fiction film The Matrix. The following year, she appeared in an episode of children's series BeastMaster.

Nicodemou has played the role of Leah Patterson (nee Poulos) in the television soap opera Home and Away since 22 March 2000. Nicodemou originally auditioned for the role of Sarah Thompson in 1992, but Laura Vasquez was cast. She was later approached by the show's producers about the role of Leah. She was not asked to audition and was offered a six-month contract, which was soon extended. As of 2019, Nicodemou is one of the show's longest serving actors.

In 2005, Nicodemou competed on and won the 3rd season of Dancing with the Stars with partner Aric Yegudkin. From 2012, Nicodemou hosted Channel Seven's reality series Please Marry My Boy. She made a guest appearance in an episode of Drop Dead Weird in 2018.

In February 2021, it was announced Nicodemou is a contestant on Seven's Dancing with the Stars: All Stars and will compete with her original partner Aric Yegudkin.

In August 2022, Nicodemou made a guest appearance on Home and Away podcast, Welcome To The Bay.

Personal life
Nicodemou married Chrys Xipolitas in 2007. They separated in 2010, but reconciled the following month. On 22 August 2012, Nicodemou gave birth to the couple's first child, a son. In March 2014, it was announced that the couple were expecting their second child. On 7 August, Nicodemou revealed that their second son had been stillborn.

Nicodemou and Xipolitas separated in late 2015. Nicodemou has been in a relationship with businessman Adam Rigby since 2016.

Since 2005 Nicodemou has been an ambassador of the PixiFoto Foundation that raises funds for a Childhood Blindness Prevention program in Africa. She is also an ambassador for Save our Sons, a charity supporting Duchenne muscular dystrophy and the National Breast Cancer Foundation. She is also a supporter of the Starlight Children's Foundation and Make-A-Wish Foundation Australia.

Filmography

Television

Film

Awards and nominations

References

External links
 
 Ada Nicodemou at the Official Home and Away website

1977 births
Australian people of Greek Cypriot descent
Australian people of Greek descent
Dancing with the Stars (Australian TV series) winners
Living people
20th-century Australian actresses
21st-century Australian actresses
Australian film actresses
Actresses from New South Wales
Australian soap opera actresses